Tenderness (French: La tendresse) is a 1930 French drama film directed by André Hugon and starring Marcelle Chantal, Jean Toulout and André Dubosc. It is based on the 1922 play of the same title by Henry Bataille. A separate German-language version Zärtlichkeit was also produced.

The film's sets were designed by the art director Christian-Jaque.

Cast
 Marcelle Chantal as Marthe Dellières 
 Jean Toulout as L'académicien Paul Barnac
 André Dubosc as Genine
 José Noguéro as Jarville, L'amant
 Pierre Juvenet as Jaliguy
 Lucien Baroux as Carlos Jarry
 Micheline Masson as Le petite Jacquot
 Jean Bara	
 Claire Nobis		
 Lucien Nobis  		
 Raymonde Sonny

References

Bibliography
 Oscherwitz, Dayna & Higgins, MaryEllen. The A to Z of French Cinema. Scarecrow Press, 2009.

External links

1930 films
1930s French-language films
Films directed by André Hugon
1930 drama films
French drama films
French black-and-white films
French films based on plays
Pathé films
1930s French films